Nizar Ben Néji is a Tunisian computer engineer and doctor in information and communication technologies, specializing in cybersecurity and cyber criminality with a special focus in his career on cryptography and PKI-related solutions. Recognized for his expertise in innovation and qualified by his rich international experience in the field of information and communication technologies, cybersecurity and cyber criminality, Dr. Ben Néji has been appointed in charge of the  Ministry of Information and Communication Technologies in Tunisia since August 2, 2021.

Biography 
Nizar Ben Neji holds a Doctorate degree in Information and Communication Technologies from the Higher School of Communications of Tunis (Sup'com) of the University of Carthage and an engineering degree from the National School of Computer Sciences of Tunis (ENSI, part of Manouba University) in 2005. He also performed postdoctoral scientific research at the University of Massachusetts Amherst in USA as Fulbright scholar, in 2015.

Career 
Dr. Ben Néji started his career as a PKI engineer and later project manager at the Tunisian Government Certification Authority (ANCE) of the Ministry of ICT and Digital Economy in Tunisia from 2005 to 2013 and was a member of several National Steering committees and working groups in charge of supervising and conducting National IT and e-Government projects.

In 2013, he joined the University of Carthage in Tunisia, as lecturer and researcher at the Faculty of Sciences of Bizerte (FSB), then at the Higher School of Communications of Tunis (Sup'com).

Dr. Ben Néji was actively involved as an expert at an international level with CTO (Commonwealth Telecommunications Organization), ITU (International Telecommunication Union) and AICTO (Arab Information and Communication Technology Organization) in delivering seminars in a wide variety of subjects related to cybersecurity and cyber criminality.

References 

Living people
Tunisian politicians
1981 births
Government ministers of Tunisia